The Group of 22 (G22 or Willard Group) was announced by the leaders of APEC (Asia–Pacific Economic Cooperation) in 1997.  The intention was to convene a number of meetings between finance ministers and central bank governors to make proposals on reform of the global financial system. The Group of 22 comprised members of the then-G8 (which became the G7—without Russia—in 2014) and 14 other countries. It first met in 1998 in Washington, D.C., US, to consider the stability of the international financial system and capital markets. In 1999, it was superseded by the Group of 33, which itself was superseded by the Group of 20 (G-20) later that year.

Hong Kong, Singapore, Malaysia and Thailand were members of the G22, but are not members of the G20. The European Union, Turkey and Saudi Arabia are members of the G20, but were not members of the G22. Poland was a member of the G22, but is only represented in the G20 through the EU seat.

Members 

G8 Nations:
 
 
 
 
 
 
 
 

Other 14 nations:

References

Defunct intergovernmental organizations
Organizations established in 1998
Organizations established in 1999